Andreas Tanzer (born April 3, 1989) is a German professional ice hockey goaltender who currently plays for ESC Dorfen of the Bavarian fourth tier league.

References

External links

1989 births
Living people
German ice hockey goaltenders
Sportspeople from Garmisch-Partenkirchen